The 2011–12 Latvian Hockey League season was the 21st season of the Latvian Hockey League, the top level of ice hockey in Latvia. Nine teams participated in the league, and HK Liepājas Metalurgs won the championship.

Regular season

Note: SC Energija of Elektrenai remained invited to the league but were not allowed to participate in the play-offs.

Playoffs
Quarterfinals
HK Juniors - JLSS/Zemgale 3-0 on series
HK Liepajas Metalurgs II - HK Riga 95 3-0 on series
Semifinals
HK Ozolnieki/Monarhs - HK Juniors 4-0 on series
HK Liepajas Metalurgs II - HK SMScredit 4-2 on series
Final
HK Liepajas Metalurgs II - HK Ozolnieki/Monarhs 4-1 on series

External links
 Season on hockeyarchives.info

Latvian Hockey League
Latvian Hockey League seasons
Latvian